is an athlete from Japan.  She competes in archery.

Matsushita represented Japan at the 2004 Summer Olympics.  She placed 35th in the women's individual ranking round with a 72-arrow score of 624.  In the first round of elimination, she faced 30th-ranked Alexandra Fouace of France.  Matsushita defeated Fouace, winning 165-157 in the 18-arrow match to advance to the round of 32.  In that round, she faced Yun Mi Jin of South Korea, losing to the 3rd-ranked archer 173-149 as Yun tied the Olympic record for an 18-arrow match.  Matsushita finished 28th in women's individual archery.

Matsushita was also a member of the 14th-place Japanese women's archery team.

Link
2004Japan Olympic Committee

1982 births
Living people
Olympic archers of Japan
Archers at the 2004 Summer Olympics
Archers at the 2002 Asian Games
Archers at the 2010 Asian Games
Japanese female archers
Asian Games competitors for Japan
21st-century Japanese women